A fingerboard is a scaled-down replica of a skateboard that a person "rides" with their fingers, rather than their feet. A fingerboard can be used to do traditional skateboarding tricks, such as an ollie and kickflip.

History
Fingerboards first existed as homemade finger toys in the late 1960s and later became a novelty attached to keychains in skate shops.

Professional skateboarder Lance Mountain is widely credited with creating the first fingerboard. In the 1985 Powell-Peralta skateboarding video titled "Future Primitive," Mountain brought fingerboarding to the skateboarders of the world. Around the same time, Mountain wrote an article on how to make fingerboards in TransWorld SKATEboarding magazine. In the video, Lance Mountain rode a homemade fingerboard in a double-bin sink. It is widely accepted that this is where the idea for the ramp found in The Search for Animal Chin came from. Some consider this the earliest fingerboard footage available for public viewing. That homemade fingerboard was built from wood, tubes, and toy train axles.

The first company to notice the potential of the fingerboard was Somerville International's Fingerboard brand, established in 1987. They were the first to mass-produce fingerboards that weren't intended to be used with a figurine or accessories. They were also the first to include licensed graphics from actual skateboard graphics with the introduction of the Pro-Precision board.

Although fingerboarding was a novelty within the skateboarding industry for years, as skateboarding reached widespread popularity in the late 1990s, X-Concepts realized the potential for the fingerboards, specifically for products bearing the logos and branding of real skateboarding brands, and introduced the Tech Deck brand. Fingerboards caught on during this period and Tech Deck has since grown into a widely recognized fingerboard brand. Toy fingerboards are now available as inexpensive novelty toys as well as high-end collectibles, complete with accessories one would find in use with standard-size skateboards. Fingerboards are also used by skateboarders as 3-D model visual aids to understand potential tricks and maneuvers.

Fingerboarding is popular in Europe, Singapore, Asia and the United States. Although fingerboarding originated in the United States, it has gained much popularity in Eastern Europe. Fingaspeak, in Steyr, Austria, is rumored to be the world's first fingerboard store, and is part of a small list of fingerboard stores worldwide. Fingerboarding has evolved from a hobby to a lifestyle for some people. Fingerboarders have regular contests, fairs, workshops and other events. Examples include FastFingers and FlatFace Rendezvous. Fingerboard-product sales were estimated at $120 million for 1999.

Fingerboarding is a good match for videography as the action can be controlled and framing  the activity offers opportunities for creativity. With the rise of the online video business from early 2006, fueled, in part, because the feature that allows e-mailing clips to friends, several thousand fingerboard and handboard videos can now be found on popular video-sharing sites such as YouTube.

Usage

Fingerboards are used by a range of people, from those utilizing them as toys, to skateboarders and related sports professionals envisioning not only their own skating maneuvers but for others as well. Similar to train enthusiasts building railway models, fingerboard hobbyists often construct and purchase reduced scale model figures that would be considered natural features to an urban skateboarder such as handrails, benches, and stairs they would be likely to encounter while skating. In addition, users might build and buy items seen in a skatepark including half-pipes, quarter pipes, trick boxes, vert ramps, pyramids, banked ramps, full pipes, and any number of other trick-oriented objects. These objects can be used simply for enjoyment and also to assist the visualization of skateboarding tricks or the "flow" from one trick to the next (colloquially referred to as "lines").

Components

Similar to a skateboard, a fingerboard consists of several components:

 Deck: Fingerboard decks are made out of plastic or wood. The shapes vary from popsicle decks, cruiser decks, and old-school decks. Modern and/or higher-quality decks have a defined nose and tail just like a real skateboard. Over the years decks got wider, for example old "Berlin Wood" decks were 29mm wide, while today decks range from 32mm-34mm.
 Trucks: Trucks are mostly mass-produced from metal for the toy industry. In recent years, however, there have also been manufacturers who produce special trucks specifically for the sport and thereby set significantly higher standards for quality in lower quantities.
 Wheels: Wheels are made of plastic, metal, or resin, widely spread is polyurethane (the same material used in skateboard wheels) as it gives a firm grip. Higher-quality wheels are also equipped with bearings. They are either cast, 3D printed, or machined on a lathe (or their industrial equivalent).
 Bearings: The bearings used in fingerboard wheels are also the same as skateboard wheel bearings. They are made of high-quality steel to make the wheels spin smoothly, the same as skateboards.
 Tape: For better adhesion, a grip tape is glued to the deck, which consists of either rubber, neoprene, fine-grain (similar to sandpaper), or foam skateboard grip.
 Screws: Are the screws that attach the trucks to the deck.
 Nuts: The nuts ensure that the wheels stay on the trucks. Widely spread are locknuts, that do not loosen as easily.
 Bushings: Fingerboard trucks have two bushings that usually smooths out riding the board. Cheap plastic boards sometimes only have hard plastic bushings, which can break easily and make it harder to do certain tricks on the fingerboard.

Fingersnowboarding, handboards and fingersurfboards 

Similar to fingerboarding, fingersnowboarding is snowboarding on a small-scale snowboard controlled with one's fingers. In December 1999 the first-ever World Snowboard Fingerboard Championships was held with a cash prize of Can$1,000.00. Sponsored by companies such as Gravity Fingerboards, Transworld Snowboarding and Snowboard Life magazines and others the competition featured twenty competitors utilizing a custom "fingerboard snowboard park." Tom Sims, a world champion of snowboarding,<ref>"Snowboarders Finally in Olympics, But Are Conforming Grudgingly", Salt Lake Tribune, February 8, 1998.</ref> ended his run by landing his fingersnowboard into a flaming shotglass of Sambuca; he was treated for minor burns and donated his winning prize to Surfrider Foundation's Snowrider Project and to Board AID.

Handboards, similar to fingerboards, are a scaled-down version of a skateboard roughly half to a third of the size of a standard skateboard (29 centimeters or 11 in) and utilizes a person's hands rather than just their fingers to control the board and perform tricks and maneuvers. Handboards, because of their larger size, more closely match the details of a standard skateboard. For instance, a skateboard truck, the wheel structure, would more likely match part for part an actual skateboard truck rather than be a cast one-piece construction or otherwise simplified. If a user preferred a particular type of wood or decorative style that could also more easily resemble a full-scale skateboard.

See also
 Skateboarding brands

References

Further reading
 Finger Skate Board Tricks and Tips Prepack by Susan Buntrock (2000); Scholastic, Incorporated - .
 Life and Limb: Skateboarders Write from the Deep End by Justin Hocking, Jeff Knutson, Jared Jacang Maher (2004); Soft Skull Press - . (See Whaling'' chapter by Justin Hocking).

Hand games
Hobbies
Skateboards
Physical activity and dexterity toys